My Melody is the debut album by American rapper Queen Pen, released on December 16, 1997 by Lil' Man Records, a distribution by Interscope Records and was executive produced by Teddy Riley.  The album went to number 78 on the Billboard 200, number 13 on the Top R&B/Hip-Hop Albums and number one on the Top Heatseekers, and had three charting singles "Man Behind the Music", "All My Love" and "Party Ain't a Party".

Track listing
Credits adapted from the album's liner notes.

Sample credits
 "Queen of the Click" contains an interpolation of "Put The Music Where Your Mouth Is", written by Pete Wingfield and Jo Wright.
 "Man Behind the Music" contains interpolations of:
 "I Know You Got Soul", written by Bobby Byrd, Charles Bobbit, and James Brown.
 "Your Love", written by James Brown.
 "All My Love" contains a sample of "Never Too Much", written and performed by Luther Vandross.
 "My Melody" contains an interpolation of "'Cause You Love Me Baby", written by Deniece Williams.
 "Party Ain't a Party" contains a sample of "On Your Face", written by Maurice White, Charles Stepney, and Philip Bailey; as recorded by Earth, Wind & Fire.
 "It's True" contains an interpolation of "True", written by Gary Kemp.
 "The Set Up" contains a sample of "Let Me Love You", written by Ray Parker Jr. and Michael Henderson, as recorded by Michael Henderson.
 "Get Away" contains a sample of "In The Air Tonight", written and performed by Phil Collins.
 "I'm Gon Blow Up" contains an interpolation of "Hollywood", written by David Wolinski and Louis Fischer.
 "Girlfriend" contains interpolations of:
 "If That's Your Boyfriend (He Wasn't Last Night)", written by Michelle Johnson.
 "It's Ecstasy When You Lay Down Next to Me", written by Ekundayo Paris and Nelson Pigford.
 "No Hooks" contains a sample of "My Friend in the Sky", written by Robert DeBarge and Bunny DeBarge, as recorded by Switch.

Personnel
 Keyboards and drum programming: Teddy Riley, Kaseem "Mixture" Coleman, Knobody, William "Skylz" Stewart
 Bass: Şerban Ghenea
 Background vocals: Richard Stites, Freaky Tah, Teddy Riley, Chauncey Hannibal
 Recording engineers: George Mayers, Şerban Ghenea, Coleman Dagget, Earl Thomas
 Mixing: George Mayers, Şerban Ghenea
 Executive Producer: Teddy Riley
 Co-Executive Producer: Markell Riley, Madeline Nelson
 Mastering: Herb Powers
 Photography: Dorothy Low

Charts

References

Queen Pen albums
1997 debut albums
Albums produced by Knobody
Albums produced by Teddy Riley
Interscope Records albums